The Idalia School is a public school that is located in the small farming and ranching community of Idalia, Colorado, United States. The school serves PK-12 students in one main building.

History

The first student to graduate from the current Idalia School was Rex Dean McEwen in 1950.

Prior to the school being opened, students living in the Idalia area attended different one-room school houses such as the Browning School, Newton School, Star School, Cook School, and another Idalia School that was in a different location.

Timeline 

 1950: The first student graduated from the current Idalia School.
 1970s: A brick wing was added to the existing school, to be used as a high school.
 1980s: A new library and music addition were added to the school.
 1995: The current gymnasium was built.
 2012-2013: After community members voted to raise their property taxes, the Idalia School received the BEST grant from the State of Colorado and built a new school.

Athletics

State championships:
Football (6-man): 1998, 2000, 2001, 2003, 2005, 2006, 2009, 2010
Girls' basketball: (1A) 2015, 2016 
Girls' track: (1A) 2007

State runner-up:
Football (6-man): 1991, 1999, 2002, 2008
Girls' volleyball: 2014, 2015 (1A)

Activities

Future Farmers of America
Future Business Leaders of America
Idalia Youth in Community Service
Drama
Art
Choir
Music

References

Public high schools in Colorado
Schools in Yuma County, Colorado